St. Theresa Catholic Church is a Catholic parish located in Rhodelia, Kentucky. It was built in 1855 and was added to the National Register of Historic Places in 1977.

The current Gothic Revival church was designed by architect William Keely and was built during 1855–61.

The church is at the center of one of the oldest Catholic settlements in the state of Kentucky, known today as "Kentucky's Holy Land". The enslaved mother and maternal grandparents of Venerable Augustus Tolton were parishioners at St Theresa until the 1830s.

References

Roman Catholic churches in Kentucky
Churches on the National Register of Historic Places in Kentucky
Gothic Revival church buildings in Kentucky
Roman Catholic churches completed in 1855
19th-century Roman Catholic church buildings in the United States
National Register of Historic Places in Meade County, Kentucky
Roman Catholic Archdiocese of Louisville
1855 establishments in Kentucky